An elevator mechanic is someone who constructs, modernizes, repairs, or services conveyances. Typically elevator mechanics work on elevators, escalators, dumbwaiters, wheelchair lifts, moving walkways and other equipment providing vertical transportation. In many places, particularly North America, elevator mechanics belong to a company called Elevator Constructors. Labor unions have a large impact on the industry, depending on the country. Mechanics make a median annual wage of $70,910 (as of May 2010). Elevator mechanic jobs are expected to grow 13 percent from 2014 to 2024.

Work environment
Elevator installers are required to lift and carry heavy parts and equipment. They are also often required to work overtime due to demand for quick repairs. Many workers are on call 24 hours a day.<

Elevator installers go through formal apprenticeships to learn the trade and a few states in the US require a license.

References

Mechanic
Installation, maintenance, and repair occupations
Mechanics (trade)